There are eighty-five mammal species in Ukraine, of which two are critically endangered, two are endangered, thirteen are vulnerable, and three are near threatened. One of the species listed for Ukraine can no longer be found in the wild. The following tags are used to highlight each species' conservation status as assessed by the International Union for Conservation of Nature:

Order: Rodentia (rodents)

Rodents make up the largest order of mammals, with over 40% of mammalian species. They have two incisors in the upper and lower jaw which grow continually and must be kept short by gnawing.

Suborder: Sciurognathi
Family: Sciuridae (squirrels)
Subfamily: Sciurinae
Tribe: Sciurini
Genus: Sciurus
 Red squirrel, S. vulgaris 
Family: Castoridae (beavers)
Genus: Castor
 Eurasian beaver, C. fiber 
Subfamily: Xerinae
Tribe: Marmotini
Genus: Marmota
 Bobak marmot, M. bobak 
Genus: Spermophilus
 European ground squirrel, Spermophilus citellus VU
 Little ground squirrel, Spermophilus pygmaeus LC
 Speckled ground squirrel, Spermophilus suslicus VU
Family: Gliridae (dormice)
Subfamily: Leithiinae
Genus: Dryomys
 Forest dormouse, Dryomys nitedula LC
Genus: Eliomys
Garden dormouse, E. quercinus 
Genus: Muscardinus
 Hazel dormouse, Muscardinus avellanarius LC
Subfamily: Glirinae
Genus: Glis
 European edible dormouse, Glis glis LC
Family: Dipodidae (jerboas)
Subfamily: Dipodinae
Genus: Stylodipus
 Thick-tailed three-toed jerboa, Stylodipus telum LC
Subfamily: Sicistinae
Genus: Sicista
 Northern birch mouse, Sicista betulina LC
 Southern birch mouse, Sicista subtilis LC
Family: Spalacidae
Subfamily: Spalacinae
Genus: Spalax
 Sandy mole rat, Spalax arenarius VU
 Bukovin mole rat, Spalax graecus VU
 Greater mole rat, Spalax microphthalmus VU
 Podolsk mole rat, Spalax zemni LC
Genus: Nannospalax
 Lesser mole rat, Nannospalax leucodon VU
Family: Cricetidae
Subfamily: Cricetinae
Genus: Cricetulus
 Grey dwarf hamster, Cricetulus migratorius LC
Subfamily: Arvicolinae
Genus: Arvicola
 European water vole, A. amphibius 
Genus: Chionomys
 Snow vole, Chionomys nivalis LC
Genus: Clethrionomys
 Bank vole, Clethrionomys glareolus LC
Genus: Ellobius
 Northern mole vole, Ellobius talpinus LC
Genus: Lagurus
 Steppe lemming, Lagurus lagurus LC
Genus: Microtus
 Common vole, Microtus arvalis LC
 Tundra vole, Microtus oeconomus LC
 Southern vole, Microtus rossiaemeridionalis LC
 Social vole, Microtus socialis LC
 European pine vole, Microtus subterraneus LC
 Tatra vole, Microtus tatricus LC
Family: Muridae (mice, rats, voles, gerbils, hamsters, etc.)
Subfamily: Murinae
Genus: Apodemus
 Striped field mouse, Apodemus agrarius LC
 Yellow-necked mouse, Apodemus flavicollis LC
 Yellow-breasted field mouse, Apodemus fulvipectus LC
 Wood mouse, Apodemus sylvaticus LC
 Ural field mouse, Apodemus uralensis LC
Genus: Micromys
 Harvest mouse, Micromys minutus LC
Genus: Mus
 Steppe mouse, Mus spicilegus LC

Order: Lagomorpha (lagomorphs)

The lagomorphs comprise two families, Leporidae (hares and rabbits), and Ochotonidae (pikas). Though they can resemble rodents, and were classified as a superfamily in that order until the early 20th century, they have since been considered a separate order. They differ from rodents in a number of physical characteristics, such as having four incisors in the upper jaw rather than two.

Family: Leporidae (rabbits, hares)
Genus: Lepus
 European hare, L. europaeus 
Mountain hare, L. timidus

Order: Erinaceomorpha (hedgehogs and gymnures)
The order Erinaceomorpha contains a single family, Erinaceidae, which comprise the hedgehogs and gymnures. The hedgehogs are easily recognised by their spines while gymnures look more like large rats.
Family: Erinaceidae (hedgehogs)
Subfamily: Erinaceinae
Genus: Erinaceus
 Southern white-breasted hedgehog, E. concolor

Order: Soricomorpha (shrews, moles, and solenodons)

The "shrew-forms" are insectivorous mammals. The shrews and solenodons closely resemble mice while the moles are stout-bodied burrowers.
Family: Soricidae (shrews)
Subfamily: Crocidurinae
Genus: Crocidura
 Bicolored shrew, C. leucodon 
Lesser white-toothed shrew, C. suaveolens 
Subfamily: Soricinae
Tribe: Nectogalini
Genus: Neomys
 Southern water shrew, N. anomalus 
Tribe: Soricini
Genus: Sorex
 Common shrew, S. araneus 
 Laxmann's shrew, S. caecutiens 
 Eurasian pygmy shrew, S. minutus 
 Caucasian pygmy shrew, S. volnuchini 
Family: Talpidae (moles)
Subfamily: Talpinae
Tribe: Desmanini
Genus: Desmana
 Russian desman, D. moschata

Order: Chiroptera (bats)

The bats' most distinguishing feature is that their forelimbs are developed as wings, making them the only mammals capable of flight. Bat species account for about 20% of all mammals.
Family: Vespertilionidae
Subfamily: Myotinae
Genus: Myotis
Bechstein's bat, M. bechsteini 
Pond bat, M. dasycneme 
Geoffroy's bat, M. emarginatus 
Greater mouse-eared bat, M. myotis 
Natterer's bat, M. nattereri 
Subfamily: Vespertilioninae
Genus: Barbastella
Western barbastelle, B. barbastellus 
Genus: Hypsugo
Savi's pipistrelle, H. savii 
Genus: Nyctalus
Greater noctule bat, N. lasiopterus 
Lesser noctule, N. leisleri 
Genus: Pipistrellus
Kuhl's pipistrelle, P. kuhlii 
Genus: Plecotus
Brown long-eared bat, P. auritus 
Grey long-eared bat, P. austriacus 
Family: Molossidae
Genus: Tadarida
European free-tailed bat, T. teniotis 
Family: Rhinolophidae
Subfamily: Rhinolophinae
Genus: Rhinolophus
Greater horseshoe bat, R. ferrumequinum 
Lesser horseshoe bat, R. hipposideros

Order: Cetacea (whales)

The order Cetacea includes whales, dolphins and porpoises. They are the mammals most fully adapted to aquatic life with a spindle-shaped nearly hairless body, protected by a thick layer of blubber, and forelimbs and tail modified to provide propulsion underwater.

Suborder: Odontoceti
Superfamily: Platanistoidea
Family: Phocoenidae
Genus: Phocoena
 Harbour porpoise, Phocoena phocoena VU
Family: Delphinidae (marine dolphins)
Genus: Tursiops
 Bottlenose dolphin, Tursiops truncatus DD
Genus: Delphinus
 Short-beaked common dolphin, Delphinus delphis LC

Order: Carnivora (carnivorans)

There are over 260 species of carnivorans, the majority of which feed primarily on meat. They have a characteristic skull shape and dentition. 
Suborder: Feliformia
Family: Felidae (cats)
Subfamily: Felinae
Genus: Felis
 European wildcat, F. silvestris 
Suborder: Caniformia
Family: Canidae (dogs, foxes)
Genus: Canis
 Golden jackal, C. aureus 
 Gray wolf, C. lupus 
 Eurasian wolf, C. l. lupus
Genus: Vulpes
 Red fox, V. vulpes 
Family: Ursidae (bears)
Genus: Ursus
 Brown bear, U. arctos 
 Eurasian brown bear, U. a. arctos
Family: Mustelidae (mustelids)
Genus: Lutra
 European otter, L. lutra 
Genus: Martes
 Beech marten, M. foina 
Genus: Meles
 European badger, M. meles 
Genus: Mustela
Steppe polecat, M. eversmannii 
European mink, M. lutreola 
 Stoat, M. erminea 
 Least weasel, M. nivalis 
 European polecat, M. putorius 
Genus: Neogale
American mink, N. vison  introduced
Genus: Vormela
 Marbled polecat, V. peregusna

Order: Perissodactyla (odd-toed ungulates)

The odd-toed ungulates are browsing and grazing mammals. They are usually large to very large, and have relatively simple stomachs and a large middle toe.

Family: Equidae (horses etc.)
Genus: Equus
 Wild horse, E. ferus  reintroduced
 Przewalski's horse, E. f. przewalskii  reintroduced
 Onager, E. hemionus  reintroduced
 Turkmenian kulan, E. h. kulan  reintroduced

Order: Artiodactyla (even-toed ungulates)
The even-toed ungulates are ungulates whose weight is borne about equally by the third and fourth toes, rather than mostly or entirely by the third as in perissodactyls. There are about 220 artiodactyl species, including many that are of great economic importance to humans.
Family: Bovidae (cattle, antelope, sheep, goats)
Subfamily: Bovinae
Genus: Bison
European bison, B. bonasus  reintroduced
Carpathian wisent, B. b. hungarorum 
Family: Cervidae (deer)
Subfamily: Capreolinae
Genus: Alces
Elk, A. alces  
Genus: Capreolus
 Roe deer, C. capreolus 
Subfamily: Cervinae
Genus: Cervus
 Red deer, C. elaphus 
Genus: Dama
 European fallow deer, D. dama  introduced
Family: Suidae (pigs)
Subfamily: Suinae
Genus: Sus
 Wild boar, S. scrofa

Locally extinct 
Siberian roe deer, Capreolus pygargus
Common bent-wing bat, Miniopterus schreibersii
 Mediterranean monk seal, Monachus monachus
Saiga antelope, Saiga tatarica

See also
Fauna of Ukraine
List of chordate orders
List of prehistoric mammals
Lists of mammals by region
Mammal classification
List of mammals described in the 2000s

References

External links 

Ukraine
Mammals
Mammals
Ukraine